In chemistry, the carbon-hydrogen bond ( bond) is a chemical bond between carbon and hydrogen atoms that can be found in many organic compounds. This bond is a covalent, single bond, meaning that carbon shares its outer valence electrons with up to four hydrogens.  This completes both of their outer shells, making them stable.

Carbon–hydrogen bonds have a bond length of about 1.09 Å (1.09 × 10−10 m) and a bond energy of about 413 kJ/mol (see table below).  Using Pauling's scale—C (2.55) and H (2.2)—the electronegativity difference between these two atoms is 0.35. Because of this small difference in electronegativities, the  bond is generally regarded as being non-polar. In structural formulas of molecules, the hydrogen atoms are often omitted. Compound classes consisting solely of  bonds and  bonds are alkanes, alkenes, alkynes, and aromatic hydrocarbons. Collectively they are known as hydrocarbons.

In October 2016, astronomers reported that the very basic chemical ingredients of life—the carbon-hydrogen molecule (CH, or methylidyne radical), the carbon-hydrogen positive ion and the carbon ion—are the result, in large part, of ultraviolet light from stars, rather than in other ways, such as the result of turbulent events related to supernovae and young stars, as thought earlier.

Bond length
The length of the carbon-hydrogen bond varies slightly with the hybridisation of the carbon atom. A bond between a hydrogen atom and an sp2 hybridised carbon atom is about 0.6% shorter than between hydrogen and sp3 hybridised carbon. A bond between hydrogen and sp hybridised carbon is shorter still, about 3% shorter than sp3 C-H. This trend is illustrated by the molecular geometry of ethane, ethylene and acetylene.

Reactions

The C−H bond in general is very strong, so it is relatively unreactive. In several compound classes, collectively called carbon acids, the C−H bond can be sufficiently acidic for proton removal. Unactivated C−H bonds are found in alkanes and are not adjacent to a heteroatom (O, N, Si, etc.). Such bonds usually only participate in radical substitution.  Many enzymes are known, however, to affect these reactions.

Although the C−H bond is one of the strongest, it varies over 30% in magnitude for fairly stable organic compounds, even in the absence of heteroatoms.

See also 
Carbon–carbon bond
Carbon–nitrogen bond
Carbon–oxygen bond
Carbon–fluorine bond

References

Organic chemistry
Chemical bonding